The Algerian Socialist Labour Party was a political party in Algeria. The party was founded in 1897 by French socialists in Algeria, ideologically close to the Social Democratic Party of Germany. In 1901 the party published the organ Le Socialiste ('The Socialist') from Alger.

The party held its fifth congress in Constantine October 2–5, 1902. The congress decided to transform the party into an Algerian Socialist Workers Federation, affiliated to the Socialist Party of France.

External links
Le Socialiste archive at the French National Library

References

Political parties established in 1897
Political parties disestablished in 1902
Socialist parties in Algeria
Political parties of the French Third Republic
Defunct political parties in Algeria
1897 establishments in Algeria
1902 disestablishments in Algeria